Mustilia orthocosta is a moth in the Endromidae family. It was described by Yang in 1995. It is found in China (Zhejiang).

References

Moths described in 1995
Mustilia